The United States Army Installation Management Command (IMCOM) is a support formation of the United States Army responsible for the day-to-day management of Army installations around the globe. Army garrisons are communities that provide many of the same types of services expected from any small city. IMCOM is a major subordinate command of U.S. Army Materiel Command (AMC). IMCOM is headquartered at Fort Sam Houston.

History 
IMCOM was activated on 24 October 2006, to reduce bureaucracy, apply a uniform business structure to manage U.S. Army installations, sustain the environment and enhance the well-being of the military community. It consolidated three organizations under a single command as a direct reporting unit:

The former Installation Management Agency (IMA)
The former Community and Family Support Center, now called Family and MWR Programs, which was formerly a subordinate command of IMCOM.
The former Army Environmental Center, now called the Army Environmental Command (AEC), which is a subordinate command of IMCOM.

Prior to IMCOM, the Army's 184 installations were managed by one of 15 Major Commands. Support services varied – some provided better services, some provided worse. In September 2001, Army Secretary Thomas E. White introduced the Transformation of Installation Management (TIM), formerly known as Centralized Installation Management (CIM), pledging the Army would implement better business practices and realign installation management to create a more efficient and effective corporate management structure for Army installations worldwide. On 1 Oct. 2002, the Army formed IMA as a field operating agency of the Assistant Chief of Staff for Installation Management (ACSIM) as part of an ongoing effort to realign installations.

Many of the issues with the 15 major commands) holding responsibility for base support was that the structure created many inequities throughout the Army. There were no common standards, consistent services, or an acutely managed infrastructure. This created an environment where funding was often diverted from installation support to operations. Additionally, there were too many military personnel conducting garrison support operations rather than mission duties. The creation of IMCOM was a commitment to eliminate these inequities, focus on installation management and enhance the well-being of soldiers, families, and civilians.

Centralizing installation management was a culture change in the Army; working through the transfers of personnel and funding issues was difficult. In a large organizational change, IMCOM became the Army’s single agency responsible for worldwide installation management, managing 184 Army installations globally with a staff of 120,000 military, civilian and contract members across seven regions on four continents.

Total Army Strong
Originally named "The Army Family Covenant" in 2007, Army leaders undertook a long-term commitment to resource and standardize critical support programs for Soldiers, their families and civilians. The covenant was focused on specific programs which commanders couldn't change. The focus was:
 Standardizing and funding existing family programs and services
 Increasing accessibility and quality of healthcare
 Improving Soldier and family housing
 Ensuring excellence in schools, youth services, and child care
 Expanding education and employment opportunities for family members

In 2014, the program was renamed "Total Army Strong" and commanders were given the flexibility of tailoring local programs best suit their communities.

The Army Family Covenant is the Army’s statement of commitment to provide high quality services to Soldiers – Active component or Reserve components, single or married, regardless of where they serve – and their Families.

The Installation Management Command supports the Total Army Strong and provides a set of tools Soldiers and Army Families can use to locate and access the facilities and services they need.

IMCOM Directorates 
The directorates administered by the United States Army Installation Management Command are:

 IMCOM Training
 IMCOM Readiness
 IMCOM Sustainment
 IMCOM Europe
 IMCOM Pacific

List of commanding generals

References

External links

 Government
 

 General information
 

2006 establishments in Virginia
Military units and formations established in 2006
Organizations based in San Antonio
United States Army Materiel Command